Five Lock Combine and Locks 37 and 38, Black River Canal is a national historic district located in the Boonville Gorge Park at Boonville in Oneida County, New York. The district includes seven locks of the abandoned Black River Canal, including the five lock combine (locks 39 through 43). The original locks were built about 1850 and rebuilt between 1887 and 1900. The canal closed in 1924.

It was listed on the National Register of Historic Places in 1973.

References

Historic districts on the National Register of Historic Places in New York (state)
Transport infrastructure completed in 1850
Historic districts in Oneida County, New York
Locks on the National Register of Historic Places in New York (state)
National Register of Historic Places in Oneida County, New York